The 1977 Dutch TT was the eighth round of the 1977 Grand Prix motorcycle racing season. It took place on 25 June 1977 at the Circuit van Drenthe Assen. Wil Hartog became the first Dutchman to win a 500cc Grand Prix when he claimed the victory.

500cc classification

350 cc classification

250 cc classification

125 cc classification

50 cc classification

Sidecar classification

References

Dutch TT
Dutch
Tourist Trophy